An Offaly County Council election was held in County Offaly in Ireland on 24 May 2019 as part of that year's local elections. All 19 councillors were elected for a five-year term of office from 3 local electoral areas (LEAs) by single transferable vote. The 2018 LEA boundary review committee made no changes to the LEAs used in the 2014 elections.

Results by party

Results by local electoral area

Birr

Edenderry

Tullamore

Results by gender

Changes since 2019
† Birr Renua Cllr John Leahy resigned from the party on 11 June 2019 and became an Independent following the party's poor electoral performance in the 2019 local elections. He has said he will retire from politics in 2021.
†† Edenderry Green Party Cllr Pippa Hackett was elected to the Seanad on the Agricultural Panel on 1 November 2019, to fill the vacancy arising from Grace O'Sullivan being elected as a Member of the European Parliament (MEP). Her husband Mark Hackett was co-opted to fill the vacancy on 19 November 2019.

Footnotes

Sources

References

2019 Irish local elections
2019